The 2016 WNBA Finals was the best-of-five championship series for the 2016 season of the Women's National Basketball Association (WNBA).  The top-seeded Minnesota Lynx held home court advantage in the Finals, but lost three games to two to the  second-seeded Los Angeles Sparks. The series followed a 2–2–1 format, and eschewed from the previous tradition of having the Western Conference champion face the Eastern Conference champion.  Instead, in the 2016 season, the top eight teams qualified for the playoffs, regardless of conference.  Both WNBA Finals teams were from the Western Conference.  The Sparks won a semifinal series against the Chicago Sky to determine one of the Finals berths; the first-seeded Lynx defeated the Phoenix Mercury to earn the other.  Candace Parker was named the 2016 WNBA Finals MVP.  Renee Brown, outgoing Chief of Basketball Operations and Player Relations of the WNBA, issued statements following games 4 and 5 saying the referees had made an error in each game. Nevertheless, the Sparks won the series 3 games to 2.

Road to the Finals

Standings and playoffs

WNBA Finals

This finals series was arguably the best the WNBA has ever seen.  The classic Western Conference showdown did not disappoint.  Los Angeles managed to steal Game 1 on the road with a 78–76 victory.  Sparks veteran guard Alana Beard hit a buzzer beater.  Minnesota bounced back in Game 2, with an effective 79–60 dropping of the Sparks to tie the series at a game a piece.  Lynx forward Maya Moore led the charge with 21 points and 12 rebounds.  Game 3 took place in LA, where the Sparks put themselves one win away from their first title in 14 years, with a dominant 92–75 win over Minnesota.  Sparks superstars Candace Parker and Nneka Ogwumike combined for 45 points on 19-of-33 shooting.  Despite home court advantage in Game 4, the Lynx responded to a devastating loss with a narrow win 85–79, forcing a decisive Game 5 back in Minnesota.  Game 5 was truly one of the greatest basketball games ever to be played.  The game was very close, but with 3.1 seconds remaining in the game, Ogwumike hit the game-winning shot, grabbing an offensive rebound and scoring, to put her team ahead 77–76.  The Sparks emerged as champions for the first time since 2002.  Parker, the team's number 1 pick in the 2008 WNBA draft, delivered 28 points and 12 rebounds as she won her first ever WNBA championship.  Parker was also named Finals MVP.

Game 1
Alana Beard hit a tie-breaking baseline jumper as time expired to give the Sparks the series lead after a seesaw first game.

Game 2

Game 3

Game 4

Game 5

Team rosters

Controversies 
After both Game 4 and Game 5 of the WNBA Finals, the league acknowledged that they had made officiating mistakes late in the games that might have affected their final outcomes. Regarding Game 5, the league released this statement: "After reviewing postgame video, we have determined that Nneka Ogwumike's shot with 1:14 remaining in regulation time should not have counted due to a shot clock violation, and that the referees improperly failed to review the play under the instant replay rules." A similar statement was released after Game 4 after the league admitted to have blown an eight-second violation call.  Nevertheless, the outcomes of the games remained the same, with Minnesota taking game 4 and Los Angeles taking game 5.

External links
Finals schedule at WNBA.com

References

Women's National Basketball Association Finals
Finals
Los Angeles Sparks
Minnesota Lynx
WNBA Finals
2016 in sports in Minnesota
2016 in sports in California
Basketball competitions in Minneapolis
Basketball competitions in Los Angeles
2016 in Los Angeles
2010s in Minneapolis